Nick Terry (born 15 September 1967) is an English former professional snooker player.

Career

Terry turned professional in 1988, losing his first match, at the 1988 International Open, 2–5 to Colin Roscoe. In his first season, Terry reached the last 32 of the 1989 Classic, where he led Doug Mountjoy 4–3 but lost 4–5. His performances in the following several seasons were not successful, but in the 1991–92 season, he reached the last 32 in two events - the 1991 UK Championship, where he lost 7–9 to Neal Foulds having led 5–1 and 6–3, and the 1992 European Open, where Martin Clark defeated him 5–3.

More last-32 runs followed in the next season; in the 1992 Grand Prix, Foulds again defeated him, this time 5–2, while in the 1993 British Open, Terry fought back from 0–3 down against John Higgins to level at 3–3, but lost 3–5.

Terry won three matches to record the best performance of his career at the 1994 Welsh Open, where he lost in the last 16, 4–5 to Jimmy White. At the International Open of that year, he was whitewashed 5–0 in the last 32 by Stephen Hendry.

Terry's qualified for the main stages of the 1996 World Championship, beating Steve Judd, Stephen Murphy and Dean Reynolds before meeting Ken Doherty in the last 32. Terry led 5–2, but eventually lost 5–10, Doherty winning eight consecutive frames to seal victory.

Having finished the 1996–97 season 68th in the world rankings, Terry was forced to enter the qualifying events in the next season to regain his professional status. Those performances were sufficient, and he returned to the tour in 1998; however, he could not recover his top-64 place, and left the professional ranks once more in 2001.

References

Living people
English snooker players
1967 births